Henriciella is a genus of bacteria from the family of Hyphomonadaceae. Henriciella is named after the American microbiologist Arthur T. Henrici.

References

Bacteria genera
Caulobacterales